Stratton Rural District was a local government division of Cornwall in England, UK, between 1894 and 1974. Established under the Local Government Act 1894, the rural district underwent boundary changes in both 1934 and 1966 with adjacent districts.

In 1974, the district was abolished under the Local Government Act 1972, forming part of the new North Cornwall district.

Civil parishes
The civil parishes within the district were:
 Jacobstow
 Kilkhampton
 Launcells
 Marhamchurch
 Morwenstow
 North Tamerton
 Poundstock
 St Gennys
 Week St Mary
 Whitstone

References

Districts of England created by the Local Government Act 1894
Districts of England abolished by the Local Government Act 1972
Rural districts of England
Local government in Cornwall
History of Cornwall